Atrocalopteryx is a genus of  damselflies belonging to the family Calopterygidae. It was established in 2005 during a phylogenetic study of the family, and its definition is still unclear.

Species
Species include:

 Atrocalopteryx atrata (Selys, 1853) 
 Atrocalopteryx atrocyana (Fraser, 1935) 
 Atrocalopteryx auco Hämäläinen, 2014
 Atrocalopteryx coomani (Fraser, 1935)
 Atrocalopteryx fasciata Yang, Hämäläinen & Zhang, 2014
 Atrocalopteryx laosica (Fraser, 1933)
 Atrocalopteryx melli (Ris, 1912) 
 Atrocalopteryx oberthueri (McLachlan, 1894)

References

Calopterygidae
Zygoptera genera